Love For Sale is a 2008 romantic comedy film directed by Russ Parr and starring Melyssa Ford, Jackie Long, Mýa, Jason Weaver, and Clifton Powell. It was released to DVD on October 21, 2008.

Plot
A hapless delivery man learns why sometimes too much of a bad thing can be detrimental to your personal well being after getting caught up with an older woman who sends his life spinning out of control. Trey (Jackie Long) may be working hard, though he just can't seem to catch a break. He's got no money for school, and his recent attempt to win over the girl of his dreams Keiley (Mýa) resulted in nothing less than complete and total embarrassment. But while a seductive woman Katherine (Melyssa Ford) may be more than happy to pay for Trey's "personal delivery services," his ideal situation is about to backfire in a way that the roving Romeo could have never seen coming.

Cast
 Jackie Long as Trey
 Melyssa Ford as Katherine
 Mýa as Keiley
 Jason Weaver as Vince
 Dominic L. Santana as Carlton
 Essence Atkins as Candace
 Tanjareen Martin as Dedra
 Angell Conwell as Sida
 Clifton Powell as Cinque
 Big Daddy Kane as Real Rex 
 Richard Lawson as Uncle Mac
 Ayesha Curry as Girl in hot tub 
Shawty as No Doubt
Lamont King as K3
Jon Stafford as Mr. Vickers 
Barbara Weetman as Mrs. Vickers 
Terrence J as DJ

DVD release
The film was released on DVD October 21, 2008.

References

External links
 

2008 romantic comedy films
2008 films
American romantic comedy films
Films shot in North Carolina
Films directed by Russ Parr
2000s English-language films
2000s American films